Rone is the nom de plume of Tyrone Wright, a street artist.

Rone may also refer to:

 Rone (musician), French music producer and artist, born Erwan Castex
 Rone, Gotland, a settlement in Sweden
 8680 Rone, a main-belt asteroid
 Rone, a Scottish word for a gutter downpipe

People with the surname
 John Rone (1949–2019), American actor and theatre director

See also
 Elling Rønes, Norwegian cross-country skier